John Allen Miller (born March 14, 1944) is a former Major League Baseball player who played with the 1966 New York Yankees and 1969 Los Angeles Dodgers. 

He is one of only two players to hit a home run in his first and last major league at-bats. The other is Paul Gillespie. Miller's first and last major league at-bat home runs (off Lee Stange and Jim Merritt respectively) were the only two home runs he hit in his MLB career.

Following his major league career, Miller played for three seasons in Japan, from  until  for the Chunichi Dragons. There, he primarily played first base, batting .245 with 79 home runs over those three seasons.

See also
List of Major League Baseball players with a home run in their first major league at bat
List of Major League Baseball players with a home run in their final major league at bat

External links

Major League Baseball first basemen
Major League Baseball outfielders
Los Angeles Dodgers players
New York Yankees players
American expatriate baseball players in Japan
Chunichi Dragons players
Baseball players from California
1944 births
Living people
Sportspeople from Alhambra, California
Harlan Smokies players
Fort Lauderdale Yankees players
Greensboro Yankees players
Columbus Confederate Yankees players
Toledo Mud Hens players
Arizona Instructional League Dodgers players
Spokane Indians players